Creed Humphrey (born June 28, 1999) is an American football center for the Kansas City Chiefs of the National Football League (NFL). He played college football at Oklahoma, where he was named the Big 12 Conference's offensive lineman of the year in 2019 and 2020. He was drafted by the Chiefs in the second round of the 2021 NFL Draft.

Early years
Humphrey is a tribal member of Citizen Potawatomi Nation. Humphrey attended the Shawnee High School in Shawnee, Oklahoma. He played both center and defensive line on the football team. Humphrey played in the 2017 U.S. Army All-American Game. Humphrey was a highly-touted prospect, with a four-star rating from 247Sports. He was ranked 294th overall in his recruiting class, but was the 5th-best prospect from the State of Oklahoma and the 3rd-best center in the country. Humphrey received nineteen scholarship offers from programs like Alabama, Texas A&M, Texas, Oklahoma State, Oklahoma, Vanderbilt, and Virginia Tech. He initially committed to Texas A&M in June 2016 but decommitted two months later and signed a National Letter of Intent with Oklahoma.

College career
Humphrey redshirted his first year at Oklahoma in 2017. He played in all 14 games with 12 starts in 2018. He returned as the starting center for Oklahoma in 2019 and 2020, being named the Big 12 Conference's offensive lineman of the year in both seasons. Following the 2020 season Humphrey announced he would be forgoing his final year of eligibility and declared for the 2021 NFL Draft.

Professional career

Humphrey was selected by the Kansas City Chiefs in the second round (63rd overall) of the 2021 NFL Draft. On May 13, 2021, he signed his rookie contract with the Chiefs. He made his first career start in the Chiefs week 1 game against the Cleveland Browns. On November 3, 2021, the midway point of the 2021 season, Pro Football Focus named Humphrey to their mid-season All-Rookie and All-Pro teams. He was named to the PFWA All-Rookie team. In 2022, Humphrey helped the Chiefs win Super Bowl LVII against the Philadelphia Eagles 38-35, by anchoring the offensive line that allowed no sacks during the game.

References

External links

Oklahoma Sooners bio
Kansas City Chiefs bio

1999 births
Living people
Sportspeople from Shawnee, Oklahoma
Players of American football from Oklahoma
American football centers
Shawnee High School (Oklahoma) alumni
Oklahoma Sooners football players
Kansas City Chiefs players
American Conference Pro Bowl players